Frette is an Italian textile company known for its linens. It was established in 1860 in Grenoble, France but relocated to Concorezzo, Italy in 1865. It is currently headquartered in Monza, Italy.

It has 9 retail locations in the United States, 25 in Asia, and many more around the world.

In 1999, the descendants of the company's founders ceded the company to an Italian fashion group.

History

Jean Baptiste Ennemonde (Edmond) Chavasse Frette was born on 12 June 1838, in Grenoble, France, from Jean Claude Chavasse Frette, a fabric dyer, merchant and manufacturer of socks and knitted shirts, and Marie Maréchal.  After her husband's death, in 1840, Marie took up the activity of millinery to support her children.

On 1 December 1860, Edmond Frette—together with Charles Chaboud and Alexandre Payre—established "Frette, Payre & Chaboud", for "the commerce and manufacture of  fabrics."  Charles Chaboud became the financial officer, and Alexandre and Edmond took the roles of traveling merchants.  As a traveling merchant, Edmond started in Italy, which was both an export market and a source of materials. Edmond first established himself in the Versilia area in Tuscany. There, Edmond also met his future wife, Ersilia Bresciani.

Between 1862 and 1863, Edmond Frette arrived in Monza. There, established another branch of the company, and in the second half of the 1860s, Edmond was able to concentrate production under the roofs of his own factories: in Concorezzo, products for the private individuals; in Sovico, coarse products for the large communities (hotels, the army, boarding-schools). The latter production represented by large the most important part of Frette's trade.

In 1881, Frette won the Gold Medal Award at the National Exhibition in Milan for the quality of its products, and in that year Frette also became an official "Provider to the Royal House."

Sales by mail catalog began in 1886, which was important at the time since most of Italy's population was agricultural, and a great part of the population lived far away from the big towns that had shops. Frette's mail catalog business ran for 90 years, and the last mail-order catalog was issued in 1976.

Frette opened a store in Rome (1887) and, shortly later, in Turin (1889).  Frette later opened stores in Genoa (1902) and Florence (1904).

On 29 August 1909, Edmond Frette died at age 71.

Until 1999, Frette was owned by the descendants of Edmond Frette's Italian backers, Giuseppe Maggi and Carlo Antonietti. That year, it was sold to the financial company Fin.part. JH Partners, a private equity firm, acquired Frette in 2005.

In October 2019, Frette introduced a new capsule collection of fine bedding, loungewear and accent pieces called Album03.

Company timeline

 1860: Jean Baptiste Edmond Frette, Alexandre Payre and Charles Chaboud manufacture and begin distributing home linens from Grenoble, France.
 1865: Two plants established in Concorezzo, Italy near Monza with production of luxury fabrics on Jacquard looms.
 1878: Opened its first retailing shop in Manzoni, Milan, in a building where it still operates today.
 1880: The Ministry of Foreign Affairs for the Kingdom of Italy commissions Frette to produce linen for the Ministry and all Italian embassies worldwide, beginning a tradition that still continues to this day.
 1881: Becomes official purveyors to the Italian Royal Family.
 1886: Introduces the first catalog sales and begins retailing outside Italy.
 1894: Creates the Tablecloth of the "Holy Virgin" for the altar of St. Peter's Basilica in Rome based on a drawing by the French painter Meurillion.
 1911: Dresses the banqueting room of the Titanic. Its products are still used today on the Orient Express train.
 1977: First Frette boutique opens in Bond Street, London.
 1978: Frette, Inc. is established in the United States.
 1989: Launches its yacht collection, offering tailor-made linen to luxury yachts.
 1999: Descendants of the company's founders cede control to an Italian fashion group.
 2001: Introduces 'Luxury' and 'Warm' collections of home accessories in silk, brocade, precious furs and cashmere.
 2009: Launches Edmond Frette, a new line designed to be "more relaxed" than its parent collection.
 2010: Celebrates its 150th anniversary.
 2013: Frette launches the European ecommerce website www.frette.com

Select hotels
The company provides linens to the following hotels worldwide, including:
 Regent hotels in Phu Quoc and Chongqing
 The Hotel Café Royal in London
 The Ritz in London
 The St. Regis Hotel in Atlanta, Toronto, Istanbul, and a few other St. Regis location
 Hotel George V in Paris
 The Mandarin Oriental in Boston
 Raffles Hotel in Singapore
 Savoy Hotel in London
 Plaza Hotel in New York City
 Ritz-Carlton in Los Angeles
 The Peninsula in Hong Kong
 The InterContinental in al-Khobar, Saudi Arabia
 Select Four Seasons
 All Ritz-Carlton U.S. properties
 All CitizenM properties
 The Langham Huntington, Pasadena, Los Angeles
 The Inn at Montchanin Village in Montchanin, Delaware

See also

 List of Italian companies

References

External links

Italian companies established in 1860
Luxury brands
Textile companies of Italy
Clothing brands of Italy